Mandi is a village and municipality in Poonch district of the Indian union territory of Jammu and Kashmir.

Demographics
According to the 2011 census of India, Mandi has 855 households. The literacy rate of Mandi was 97.51% compared to 67.16% of Jammu and Kashmir. In Mandi, Male literacy stands at 98.37% while the female literacy rate was 91.71%.

Transport

Road
Mandi village is well-connected by road to other places in Jammu and Kashmir and India by the Rajouri Highway.

Rail

Air

See also
Jammu and Kashmir
Poonch district
Poonch

References

Villages in Mandi tehsil